Atylostagma is a genus of beetles in the family Cerambycidae, containing the following species:

 Atylostagma glabra Schaeffer, 1909
 Atylostagma polita White, 1853

References

Elaphidiini